Monte Pracaban is a mountain in the Valle Stura, Liguria, northern Italy, part of the Ligurian Apennines.

Geography 
The mountain is located on the boundary between the comune of Campo Ligure in Liguria, and that of Bosio in Piedmont.

Nature conservation 
The ligurian side of the mountain and its surrounding area are included in a SIC (Site of Community Importance) called Praglia - Pracaban - M. Leco - P. Martin (code  IT1331501). Its NE slopes are included in the Piedmontese natural park of the Capanne di Marcarolo.

References

Mountains of Liguria
Mountains of Piedmont
Natura 2000 in Italy
Mountains under 1000 metres
Mountains of the Apennines